is a town in Miyaki District, Saga Prefecture, Japan. It is the first town in Saga to have its name spelled in hiragana rather than kanji. It is named after the district it is located in. As of March 1, 2017, the town has an estimated population of 25,534.

Geography
The northern part of Miyaki contains the Chikushi Mountains, and the southern part contains the Chikugo River. It borders Fukuoka Prefecture on the north and south.

Adjoining municipalities
Saga Prefecture
Kamimine
Tosu
Kanzaki
Yoshinogari
Fukuoka Prefecture
Kurume
Nakagawa

History
 April 1, 1889 - The present system of municipalities is established and the area occupied by Miyaki consists of the villages of Nakabaru, Kitashigeyasu, Minamishigeyasu, and Mikawa.
 April 1, 1955 - The villages Minamishigeyasu and Nakabaru merge to form Mine Village.
 May 5, 1962 - Mine Village becomes Mine Town.
 April 1, 1965 - Kitashigeyasu Village becomes Kitashigeyasu Town.
 April 1, 1971 - Nakabaru Village becomes Nakabaru Town.
 March 1, 2005 - The towns of Mine, Kitashigeyasu and Nakabaru merge to form Miyaki Town.

Education

High schools
Saga Prefectural Miyaki High School

Junior high schools
Nakabaru Junior High School
Kitashigeyasu Junior High School
Mine Junior High School

Elementary schools
Nakabaru Elementary School
Kitashigeyasu Elementary School
Mine Higashi Elementary School
Mine Nishi Elementary School

Transportation

Air
The nearest airports are Saga Airport and Fukuoka Airport.

Rail
JR Kyushu
Nagasaki Main Line
Nakabaru Station

Road
Expressways:
There are no expressways in Miyaki. The closest interchange is the Higashisefuri Interchange.
National highways:
Route 34
Route 264
Prefectural roads:
Saga Prefectural Routes 19, 22 and 31

Notable places
Chiriku Hachiman Shrine
Shirasaka Park

References

External links

 Miyaki official website 

Towns in Saga Prefecture